Henri Béraldi (6 February 1849, Paris – 31 March 1931, Paris) was a French bibliophile, publisher and author of books on the Pyrenees and on French printmakers of the 19th century.

Henri Béraldi was the son of Pierre Louis Béraldi, a senator in the Third Republic between 1876 and 1885. Henri married Mathilde Gavet in 1880. They had five children, including Pierre and André Béraldi, both chevaliers of the Légion d'honneur, and Jacques Béraldi, an officier in the same order.

The collection of Henri Béraldi consisted mainly of French illustrated books and books with special bindings, and was considered one of the four most important collections of its type, together with the collections of Ferdinand James von Rothschild, Louis Roederer and Robert Schuhmann.

He enjoyed holidays in the spa town of Bagnères-de-Luchon in the Pyrenees, and became a noted writer on the range. Pic Béraldi, also known as the Eriste N or the Bagüeñola Norte, is a 3,205m-high peak in the Spanish Province of Huesca named after him.

Béraldi was the president of the Société des amis des livres. from 1901 to 1931, and an officier of the Légion d'honneur.

After his death in 1931, his collection (minus a selection of books on the Pyrenees, which was donated to the library of Toulouse) was sold in a five-day auction in 1934–35.

Books by Béraldi
1874: L'oeuvre de Moreau le jeune
1879: Charles-Étienne Gaucher : graveur : notice et catalogue, together with Baron 
1880–1882: Les graveurs du XVIIIe siècle, together with Baron Roger Portalis, published by Morgand et Fatout in Paris.
1884: Mes estampes, 1872–1884
1885: 1865–1885: Bibliothèque d'un Bibliophile, published by L. Danel in Lille
1885–1892: Les Gravures du XIXe Siecle, 12 volumes
1892: Estampes et Livres, 1872–1892, published by Conquet
1892: Raffet, peintre national
1893: Voyage d'un livre à travers la Bibliothèque Nationale, published by G. Masson in Paris
1895–1897: La reliure du XIXè siècle
1898–1904: Cent Ans aux Pyrenées, published in Paris in 7 volumes
1902: Exposition de la reliure moderne au Musée Galliera. Mai-juin 1902. Rapport général
1904: L'œuvre gravé et lithographié de Alphonse Legros, orné d'une eau-forte originale, et d'un fac-similé du portrait de l'artiste d'après son propre dessin., published by Hesselé in Paris
1907–1910: Balaitous et Pelvoux, published in Paris in 2 volumes
1911–1931: Notes d'un Bibliophile, published in Paris in 10 volumes
1913: Un Caricaturiste Prophete. La Guerre Telle Qu'elle Est, with caricaturist Albert Robida
1920: Le passé du pyrénéisme. Notes d'un bibliophile, published by Lahure in Paris
1927: La carrière posthume de Ramond; notes d'un bibliophile 1827–1868
1931: En marge du Pyrénéisme. Notes d'un bibliophile. L'Affaire Rilliet-Planta, published in Paris by Béraldi
1934: Bibliothèque Henry Béraldi, the auction catalogue for his collection

Books published by Béraldi
1892: Paysages Parisiens, text by Émile Goudeau, illustrations by Auguste Lepère
1893: Tableaux de Paris. Paris qui consomme., text by Émile Goudeau, illustrations by Pierre Vidal
1895: Paris au hasard, text by Georges Montorgueil, drawings and engravings by Auguste Lepère
1897: Tableaux de Paris. Paris qui consomme., text by Émile Goudeau, illustrations by Charles Jouas
1897: Poèmes Parisiens, text by Émile Goudeau, illustrations by Charles Jouas
1902: Paris-Staff. Exposition de 1900, text by Émile Goudeau

Notes

Further reading

External links

1849 births
1931 deaths
Bibliophiles
Officiers of the Légion d'honneur
Writers from Paris
Pyrénéistes